Kim Clijsters was the defending champion, but withdrew due to an abdominal injury.

Maria Sharapova won the tournament, defeating Jelena Janković 4–6, 7–6(7–3), 6–3 in the final.

Seeds
The top eight seeds received a bye into the second round.

Qualifying

Main draw

Finals

Top half

Section 1

Section 2

Bottom half

Section 3

Section 4

References
Main Draw

Western and Southern Open
2011 Western & Southern Open